Lillehammer Municipality is the local government for Lillehammer, Norway. The administration is located in the town of Lillehammer.

The municipality is governed by a 47-member municipal council, which is led by Mayor Espen Granberg Johnsen. The municipal administration is led by Annar Skrefsru.

References

Lillehammer